The Soil (in Persian: خاک "khak") is a 1973 Iranian film by Masud Kimiai from the novel by Mahmoud Dowlatabadi. The film stars Behrouz Vossoughi, Farzaneh Taidi, and Faramarz Gharibian.

References

1973 films
Films directed by Masoud Kimiai
Iranian drama films
1973 crime drama films
Iranian black-and-white films